is a series of yonkoma manga parody anthologies written and illustrated by various artists and published by Futabasha, based on various video game series such as Mario and The Legend of Zelda.

Changes of series

Early Days (1991–93)
Futabasha began by publishing the Famicom Adventure Game Book series.
4 Koma Manga Kingdom was an effort by a rotating amateur team of artists and writers.  Some of the most notable artists were Noboru Matsuyama, Satomi Nakamura, Ryo Sasaki, and Morita Yasuhiro.  The series started gaining popularity around 1993.

Golden Age (1994–97)
Super Mario 4Koma Manga Kingdom was a series competing with Super Mario 4koma Manga Theater in popularity.
Satomi Nakamura and Suhiro Moritaya were so popular that their art essentially made up volumes 5, 6 and 7.
Although the big hit of Pokémon was received from 1996 and much 4koma manga comics of Pokémon was published from the other company, only why or Futabasha has not published. This has a certain back situation which is not published, and is spoken about as it was not able to publish.
Although Pokémon was a huge success, the publisher Futabasha did not publish any material regarding the franchise.  This could indicate that their relationship with Nintendo had fallen apart.
The series declined after 1998, receiving poor reception and ceasing print of their Mario series.  Their last volume, published in 2004, was based on the Ganbare Goemon series.

Publications

1991-1997
Famicom 4koma Manga Kingdom 1-3
RPG 4koma Manga Kingdom
Wizardry 4koma Manga Kingdom
Super Mario 4koma Manga Kingdom 1-7
Nekketsu Kōha Kunio-kun 4koma Manga Kingdom
Ganbare Goemon 4koma Manga Kingdom
Momotaro Densetsu 4koma Manga Kingdom
The Legend of Zelda 4koma Manga Kingdom 1-2
Hanjuku Hero 4koma Manga Kingdom
Bomberman 4koma Manga Kingdom 1-4
Street Fighter 4koma Manga Kingdom 1-4
Fire Emblem 4koma Manga Kingdom
Fatal Fury Special 4Koma Manga Kingdom
Hoshi no Kirby 4Koma Manga Kingdom
Mother2 4Koma Manga Kingdom
Donkey Kong Country 4Koma Manga Kingdom 1-3
Shin Samurai Spirits 4Koma Manga Kingdom
Battle Arena Toshinden 4Koma Manga Kingdom
Super Mario: Yoshi's Island 4Koma Manga Kingdom 1-2
Tekken 4Koma Manga Kingdom
Tactics Ogre 4Koma Manga Kingdom
Beyond the Beyond - Harukanaru e Kanaan 4Koma Manga KingdomFujimaru Jigoku-hen 4Koma Manga KingdomStreet Fighter Zero 4Koma Manga KingdomVampire Hunter 4Koma Manga KingdomSuper Mario 64 4Koma Manga KingdomPuyo Puyo 4Koma Manga KingdomMario Kart 64 4Koma Manga Kingdom1998-2000Baku Bomberman 4Koma Manga KingdomGanbare Goemon 4Koma Manga JourneyYoshi's Story 4Koma Manga KingdomMario Party 4Koma Manga KingdomThe Legend of Zelda: Ocarina of Time 4Koma Manga KingdomOgre Battle 64 4Koma Manga KingdomMario Party 2 4Koma Manga KingdomKirby 64 4Koma Manga Kingdom2001 onwardsKorokoro Kirby 4Koma Manga KingdomMario Party 3 4Koma Manga KingdomThe Legend of Zelda: Fushigi no Konomi 4Koma Manga KingdomLuigi's Mansion 4Koma Manga KingdomTomato Adventure 4Koma Manga KingdomDōbutsu no Mori + 4Koma Manga KingdomDobutsu Bancho 4Koma Manga KingdomMonster Farm Advance 4Koma Manga KingdomFire Emblem: Fūin no Tsurugi 4Koma Manga KingdomSuper Mario Sunshine 4Koma Manga KingdomThe Legend of Zelda: Kamigami no Triforce 4Koma Manga KingdomDōbutsu no Mori e+ 4Koma Manga KingdomKirby Air Ride 4Koma Manga KingdomRockman X7 4Koma Manga Kingdom 4Koma Manga Kingdom''

References

Comedy anime and manga
1991 manga
Yonkoma
Futabasha manga